George Cooke was the Deputy Governor of Bombay from 1689 to 1690.

References

Year of birth missing
Year of death missing
Deputy Governors of Bombay